Tecia kiefferi is a moth in the family Gelechiidae. It was described by Kieffer and Jörgensen in 1910. It is found in Argentina.

The wingspan is about 26.5 mm. The forewings are ash-grey, sprinkled with black. The hindwings are dark grey.

References

Tecia
Moths described in 1910